Azat is a village in the Vardenis Municipality of the Gegharkunik Province of Armenia. The village was populated by Azerbaijanis before the exodus of Azerbaijanis from Armenia after the outbreak of the Nagorno-Karabakh conflict. In 1988-1989 Armenian refugees from Azerbaijan settled in the village.

History 
Located in the village is a heavily ruined 11th century church and a pair of medieval khachkars.

The village was the birthplace of Azerbaijani ashik Ashig Alasgar (1821–1926).

Demographics 
In 1911, Azat, then known as Agkilisa, had a predominantly Tatar (later known as Azerbaijani) population of 180 within the Nor Bayazet uezd of the Erivan Governorate of the Russian Empire.

References

External links 
 
 

Populated places in Gegharkunik Province